Sue Harris is an English musician classically trained as an oboeist, but best known for her folk music performances with the hammered dulcimer.

Biography
Harris is fluent in reading and writing music and switched from her original instrument, the oboe, to the dulcimer in the mid-1970s. In making that switch, she became one of the foremost performers on that folk instrument, though at the time it seemed just a matter of expediency. She was married to John Kirkpatrick, a prominent melodeon virtuoso in England, was pregnant with their first son, and found herself unable to maintain the breath control needed to play the oboe.

She performed on both instruments with the Albion Country Band on their debut album Battle of the Field (1976), and also recorded and performed as one half of a duet with Kirkpatrick. Harris has also performed with Richard and Linda Thompson, and has been a composer for the BBC on various broadcast plays, as well as for live theatre. She is also a singer and has written music for choral groups.

More recently, in 2008 she was leader of the "Wild Angels Community Choir" in Welshpool, Powys, Wales.

Following the World Dulcimer Congress held in Malvern, Worcestershire in 2015, Harris formed the English Dulcimer Duo with Lisa Warburton. The duo has toured extensively, performing a repertoire of mainly English tunes, but also including a number of jaunty 18th-century melodies and Welsh tunes.

Discography

Solo albums
 Hammers and Tongues (Free Reed Records FRR 020, 1978)
 Pastorela (Beautiful Jo Records, 2002)

Albion Country Band
Battle of the Field (Island Records, 1973)

The English Country Blues Band
 No Rules (1982)
 Unruly (2014)

John Kirkpatrick and Sue Harris
 The Rose of Britain's Isle (1974)
 The Bold Navigators (with Jon Raven) (1975)
 Plain Capers - Morris Dance Tunes From the Cotswolds (1976)
 Among The Many Attractions at the Show will be a Really High Class Band (1976)
 The English Canals Songs, Narration, Contemporary Extracts (with Jon Raven) (1976)
 Shreds and Patches (1977)
 Facing the Music (1980)
 Ballad Of The Black Country (1981)
 Stolen Ground (1989)

In 2009 Topic Records included in their 70-year anniversary boxed set Three Score and Ten The Rose Of Britain’s Isle / Glorishears  from The Rose Of Britain’s Isle as track thirteen on the second CD.

Martin Wyndham-Read, Sue Harris and Martin Carthy
 The Old Songs (1984)
 Across The Line (1986)

Various artists – Sue Harris, Old Swan Band et al.
 This Label is Not Removable (2007)https://mainlynorfolk.info/folk/records/thislabelisnotremovable.html

Tufty Swift
 Hammers, Tongues And A Bakewell Tart (2007) (CD reissue of Hammers and Tongues)

See also
 Benji Kirkpatrick

References

External links
Pastorela
Choir leader

Living people
English folk singers
British folk rock musicians
English composers
Year of birth missing (living people)
Place of birth missing (living people)
The Albion Band members
Topic Records artists